is a former Japanese football player.

Playing career
Suzuki was born in Chiba Prefecture on April 28, 1977. After graduating from Senshu University, he joined J2 League club Shonan Bellmare in 2000. Although he could hardly play in the match behind Yuji Ito until 2001, he played many matches from 2002. However he could hardly play in the match behind Hiroki Kobayashi in 2005. In 2006, he moved to J1 League club Cerezo Osaka. However he could not play at all in the match behind Motohiro Yoshida and the club was relegated to J2 end of 2006 season. In 2007, he moved to J2 club Tokushima Vortis on loan. He battles with Torashi Shimazu for the position and he played many matches. In 2008, he returned to Cerezo Osaka. However he could not play at all in the match behind Takashi Aizawa, Hiromasa Yamamoto and Kim Jin-hyeon in 2 seasons and retired end of 2009 season.

Club statistics

References

External links

1977 births
Living people
Senshu University alumni
Association football people from Chiba Prefecture
Japanese footballers
J1 League players
J2 League players
Shonan Bellmare players
Cerezo Osaka players
Tokushima Vortis players
Association football goalkeepers